Luis Delgado may refer to:
 Luís Delgado (born 1979), Angolan footballer
 Luis Delgado (musician) (born 1956), Spanish musician
 Luis Delgado (Colombian footballer) (born 1980), Colombian footballer
 Luis Eduardo Delgado (born 1984), Spanish footballer
 Luis Antonio Delgado (born 1990), Mexican footballer
 Luis Delgado (tennis), Dominican tennis player